Fernando Morales Martínez (born 20 August 1969) is a Mexican politician from the Movimiento Ciudadano Party. From 2009 to 2012 he served as Deputy of the LXI Legislature of the Mexican Congress representing Puebla.

References

1969 births
Living people
People from Puebla (city)
Institutional Revolutionary Party politicians
21st-century Mexican politicians
Deputies of the LXI Legislature of Mexico
Members of the Chamber of Deputies (Mexico) for Puebla